Chapter V of the Constitution of Australia deals with the relationship between the states and the Commonwealth, and other matters pertaining to the states.

It is composed of fifteen sections, namely:
 Section 106: Saving of Constitutions
 Section 107: Saving of power of State Parliaments
 Section 108: Saving of State laws
 Section 109: Inconsistency of laws
 Section 110: Provisions referring to Governor
 Section 111: States may surrender territory
 Section 112: States may levy charges for inspection laws
 Section 113: Intoxicating liquids
 Section 114: States may not raise forces. Taxation of property of Commonwealth or State
 Section 115: States not to coin money
 Section 116: Commonwealth not to legislate in respect of religion
 Section 117: Rights of residents in States
 Section 118: Recognition of laws etc. of States
 Section 119: Protection of States from invasion and violence
 Section 120: Custody of offenders against laws of the Commonwealth

Reference list

Australian constitutional law